Chungnyeolsa can refer to various Korean shrines, including:

Chungnyeolsa (Chungju), a shrine to Im Gyeong Eop in Chungju
Chungnyeolsa (Goseong), a shrine to Yi Sun-sin in Goseong
Chungnyeolsa (Busan), a shrine to Song Sang-hyeon in Busan